The Wright-Hargreaves Mine is a gold mine located in Kirkland Lake, Ontario. In late July 1911, Bill Wright and his brother-in-law Ed Hargreaves discovered the first visible gold in what would later become the Kirkland Lake camp. By the end of its production, the Wright-Hargreaves was the deepest mine in the Kirkland Lake camp with workings at the  level. The mine was in regular production between 1921 and 1964. Production ceased following a serious rock burst underground in August 1964. The processing plant was previously shutdown in 1957 and production was transported to the Lake Shore mine for processing.

See also
List of mines in Ontario

References

Mines in Northern Ontario
Kirkland Lake
Gold mines in Ontario
Underground mines in Canada